Jenkowice may refer to the following places in Poland:
Jenkowice in Gmina Oleśnica, Oleśnica County in Lower Silesian Voivodeship (SW Poland)
Jenkowice in Gmina Kostomłoty, Środa Śląska County in Lower Silesian Voivodeship (SW Poland)